The Samyang 12mm F2.8 ED AS NCS Fish-eye is an interchangeable camera lens announced by Samyang on November 1, 2014.

References

Camera lenses introduced in 2014
012
Fisheye lenses